Zagorë (post 2002 alternative name: Zogaj) is a village located in the Municipality of Vushtrri, District of Mitrovica, Kosovo.

Geography
Village has a close geographical position toward five municipal centres in north-eastern Kosovo: Vushtrri (9 km / 6 mi. W), Podujevo (13 km / 8 mi. NE), Obiliq (16 km / 10 mi. S), Mitrovica (18 km / 11 mi. WNW), Prishtina (19 km / 12 mi. SSE).

Zagorje borders with Dumnica e Krasniqes (3 km / 2 mi. SE), Samodreža (3 km / 2 mi. WSW),  Cecelia (3 km / 2 mi. WNW), and Donje Ljupče (3 km / 2 mi. NNE).

Notes and references
Notes:

References:

Villages in Vushtrri